William Elsworth Blackbeard (April 28, 1926 – March 10, 2011), better known as Bill Blackbeard, was a writer-editor and the founder-director of the San Francisco Academy of Comic Art, a comprehensive collection of comic strips and cartoon art from American newspapers. This major collection, consisting of 2.5 million clippings, tearsheets and comic sections, spanning the years 1894 to 1996, has provided source material for numerous books and articles by Blackbeard and other researchers.

Biography 
Born in Lawrence, Indiana, Blackbeard spent his childhood in this rural town northeast of Indianapolis. His grandfather ran a service station; his father, Sydney Blackbeard, was an electrician, and his mother, Thelma, handled the bookkeeping for Sydney's business. When he was eight or nine, the family moved to Newport Beach, California, where he attended high school.

During World War II, Blackbeard served with the 89th Cavalry Reconnaissance Squad, 9th Army, in France, Belgium and Germany. In the post-war years, he went to Fullerton College on the G.I. Bill, studying history, English and American literature. He also worked on the staff of the Torch, the college yearbook.

Books

Blackbeard vigorously defended comic strips as worthy of study. "The comic strip is the only wholly indigenous American art form. . . . Only the tasteless and uninformed consider comic art trivial." He described comic books, by contrast, as "meretricious dreck," which may have marginalized him in the broader field of comic art.

As a freelance writer, Blackbeard wrote, edited or contributed to more than 200 books on cartoons and comic strips, including 100 Years of Comic Strips, the Krazy & Ignatz series (Eclipse/Fantagraphics) and NBM's 18-volume Wash Tubbs and Captain Easy. His contributions to various magazines has been documented by illustrator John Adcock, who commented:

In 1977, Blackbeard and the jazz critic Martin Williams collaborated on The Smithsonian Collection of Newspaper Comics, regarded by the comics community as a major work in the field because it provides an authoritative overview of the 20th century's leading strips.

San Francisco Academy of Comic Art
Finding that libraries were discarding bound newspapers after microfilming, Blackbeard established the San Francisco Academy of Comic Art in 1968 as a non-profit organization and began collecting newspapers from California libraries, expanding his scope to institutions nationwide. Blackbeard and his wife Barbara, married in 1966, were forced out of several San Francisco addresses by the growth of Bill's collections. The Academy found its longest lasting home in a Spanish stucco home at 2850 Ulloa Street in San Francisco's quiet residential Sunset district. The scope of this collection was detailed by Jeet Heer:

During three decades of acquisition, Blackbeard accumulated 75 tons of material, which filled both the upstairs rooms and the ground-floor garage. In 1997, he learned that the owner of the home was not going to renew his lease, necessitating a new location for the SFACA collection.

Blackbeard then entered into negotiations with Lucy Shelton Caswell, curator of Ohio State University's Billy Ireland Cartoon Library & Museum (then known as the Cartoon Research Library). In January 1998, six semi-trailer trucks moved the collection from California to Ohio. The Billy Ireland Cartoon Library & Museum offered this description of Blackbeard's collection:

Double Fold
It was Blackbeard who told Nicholson Baker about "fraudulent" studies used by libraries to justify their massive destruction of books and newspapers, information documented by Baker in his book Double Fold: Libraries and the Assault on Paper (2001), a National Book Critics Circle Award Winner. Baker, who devoted the preface of that book to his discussions with Blackbeard, later commented:

According to Billy Ireland Cartoon Library & Museum curator Jenny E. Robb, Blackbeard left bound volumes intact in later years.

Later life and death 
After he sold the collection to Ohio State in 1997, Blackbeard moved from San Francisco to Santa Cruz, California, where his wife liked to surf. He continued to contribute to books and indulge his interests, in addition to comic strips, in pulp magazines, old films and penny dreadfuls.

At age 84, Blackbeard died on March 10, 2011, in Watsonville, California.

Awards
Blackbeard received a 2004 Eisner Award for Krazy & Ignatz, the archival series of Krazy Kat Sunday pages that included additional work and biographical information on George Herriman .

See also
List of newspaper comic strips

References

Sources
Comic Book Awards Almanac

External links
Bill Blackbeard bibliography
Dylan Williams' interview with Bill Blackbeard (1994)
The Ohio State University Billy Ireland Cartoon Library & Museum: San Francisco Academy of Comic Art Collection Guide
Bill Blackbeard: Paper Savior Part 1 and Part 2, articles by Kristy Valenti at ComiXology.com
Bill Blackbeard Tributes
R.C. Harvey "Bill Blackbeard, The Man Who Saved Comics, Dead at 84", April 25, 2011. 
Allan Holtz review: Nicholson Baker's Double Fold
Caitlin McGurk: "Happy Birthday, Bill Blackbeard!" (April 28, 2012)

1926 births
2011 deaths
American art curators
American historians
People from Marion County, Indiana
Writers from Indianapolis
American art historians
History of comics